Irit Amiel (5 May 1931 – 16 February 2021) was a Polish-born Israeli poet, writer and translator.

Biography
Irena Librowicz (later Irit Amiel) was  born in Częstochowa. 

Amiel was twice nominated for the Nike Literary Award.

References 

1931 births
2021 deaths
Israeli poets
Israeli people of Polish-Jewish descent
Jewish poets
Polish emigrants to Mandatory Palestine
Holocaust survivors
People from Częstochowa
Israeli women poets
Jewish women writers